Neil Jenney is a self-taught artist born on November 6, 1945 in Torrington, Connecticut. He attended Massachusetts College of Art in 1964. In 1966 he moved to New York City where he currently resides.

His painting style was described by the art critic Marcia Tucker in 1978 as Bad Painting, a description which he has embraced. Jenney describes his style as realism, but it is an idiosyncratic use of the word on his part, meaning: a style in which narrative truths are found in the simple relationships of objects. His body of work during 1969–1970, which is the period for which he was first known, was a reaction to minimalism and photo-realism. The work's impact was large for such a brief period: according to  New York Times art critic Roberta Smith "in those two years Mr. Jenney helped put representational painting on a new course and established precedents for the art of the 1970s, 80s and 90s."

Often, Jenney's work of this period depicted pairs of objects which had evocative cause and effect relationships (such as a saw and a piece of cut wood, as are depicted in the 1969 piece Sawn and Saw.) In an April 15, 2001 review in the New York Observer of his show of work from the late 60s and early 70s at Gagosian Gallery, Mario Naves said that the paintings: "...aren't really bad at least not bad bad. That pejorative adjective, in Mr. Jenney's case, comes with scare quotes a mile high and connotes an art that combines the dead-end figuration of Pop, the dead-end materiality of Minimalism and a sense of humor that is, if not dead-end, then sharply deadpan. Mr. Jenney painted the pictures during the heyday of Conceptual Art, and if they were, in part, a rebuff to its disembodied verities, they also partook of its intellectual detachment."

His painting Here and There (1969), which depicts a white fence dividing a field of drippy, green brushstrokes, was in the 2004 exhibition The Undiscovered Country at the Hammer Museum in Los Angeles. His work is in many museums including the Museum of Modern Art, The Metropolitan Museum of Art, the Whitney Museum of American Art, and the Corcoran Gallery of Art in Washington D.C. He currently shows with the Barbara Mathes Gallery. His painting "Meltdown Morning" is on display at the Philadelphia Museum of Art.

Sources
 Ausstellungskatalog: documenta 5. Befragung der Realität – Bildwelten heute; Katalog (als Aktenordner) Band 1: (Material); Band 2: (Exponatliste); Kassel 1972
 documenta Archiv (Hrsg.); Wiedervorlage d5 – Eine Befragung des Archivs zur documenta 1972; Kassel/Ostfildern 2001, 

1945 births
Living people
Massachusetts College of Art and Design alumni
Painters from New York City
20th-century American painters
American male painters
21st-century American painters
21st-century American male artists
20th-century American male artists